Stigmella roborella is a moth of the family Nepticulidae. It is found throughout Europe and in south-west Asia. In Europe, it has been recorded from nearly every country, except Albania, Belarus, Bosnia and Herzegovina, Bulgaria, Ireland, Moldova, Portugal, Romania and Yugoslavia.
It has recently been recorded from Georgia, Macedonia and Turkey.

Adults are on wing from April to September.

The larvae feed on Quercus castaneifolia, Quercus cerris, Quercus petraea, Quercus pubescens, Quercus robur and Quercus rubra. They mine the leaves of their host plant. The mine consists of a long, slender corridor. In the first part the frass is concentrated in a narrow line.

References

Further reading
 

Nepticulidae
Moths described in 1971
Moths of Europe
Moths of Asia